Jandiala Assembly constituency (Sl. No.: 14) is a Punjab Legislative Assembly constituency in Amritsar district, Punjab state, India. It includes Jandiala Guru town.

Members of Legislative Assembly
 2012: Baljit Singh Jalal Usma, Shiromani Akali Dal

Election results

2022

2017

References

External links
  

Assembly constituencies of Punjab, India
Amritsar district